Estrela do Norte Futebol Clube, commonly known as Estrela do Norte, is a Brazilian football club based in Cachoeiro do Itapemirim, Espírito Santo state. They competed twice in the Copa do Brasil, once in the Série B, seven times in the Série C, and once in the Série D.

History
The club was founded on January 1, 1916. Estrela do Norte won the Campeonato Capixaba in 2014, the Campeonato Capixaba Second Level in 1996 and in 1999, and the Copa Espírito Santo in 2003, 2004 and in 2005. They competed in the Copa do Brasil in 2005 and in 2006, being eliminated in the First Round in both editions. Estrela do Norte competed in the Série B in 1987, in the Série C in 1995, 1996, 2001, 2003, 2004, 2005, and in 2006, and in the Série D in 2014.

Achievements
 Campeonato Capixaba:
 Winners (1): 2014
 Campeonato Capixaba Second Level:
 Winners (2): 1996, 1999
 Copa Espírito Santo:
 Winners (3): 2003, 2004, 2005

Stadium
Estrela do Norte Futebol Clube play their home games at Estádio Mário Monteiro, nicknamed Estádio Sumaré. The stadium has a maximum capacity of 6,000 people.

References

Association football clubs established in 1916
Football clubs in Espírito Santo
1916 establishments in Brazil